Sweden entered the Eurovision Song Contest 2009 with "La voix", performed by Malena Ernman. Ernman was the winner of the Swedish song contest Melodifestivalen, which serves as Sweden's selection process for Eurovision.

Ernman represented Sweden at the first semi-final of the Contest on 12 May 2009, where she qualified to the final of the Contest after receiving 105 points, placing 4th in a field of 18 competing entries. At the final she performed 4th on stage. At the close of the voting she had received 33 points, placing 21st of the 25 competing countries.

Before Eurovision

Melodifestivalen 2009

Melodifestivalen 2009 was a Swedish song contest held between February and March 2009. It was the selection for the 49th song to represent Sweden in the Eurovision Song Contest, and was the 48th Melodifestivalen. Five heats were held in the Swedish cities of Gothenburg, Skellefteå, Leksand and Malmö, with Norrköping hosting the final Andra Chansen (Second Chance) round. The final of the contest was contested in the Swedish capital of Stockholm, at the Globe Arena, where 11 songs competed to win the contest and represent Sweden at the Eurovision Song Contest 2009 in Moscow, Russia.

The 2009 edition of Melodifestivalen implemented a number of new rules which changed the dynamics of the contest, including more people, pre-recorded backing vocals and a new international jury who selected an 11th finalist.

Semi-finals and Second Chance round 

 The first heat took place on 3 February 2007 at the Scandinavium in Gothenburg. "Stay the Night" performed by Alcazar and "You're My World" performed by Emilia qualified directly to the final, while "Snälla, snälla" performed by Caroline af Ugglas and "Jag tror på oss" performed by Scotts advanced to the Second Chance round. "Snälla, snälla" was also selected by the international jury to progress to the wildcard round. "Tick Tock" performed by Nina Söderquist, "Welcome to My Life" performed by Jonathan Fagerlund, "Med hjärtat fyllt av ljus" performed by Shirley Clamp, and "Disconnect Me" performed by Marie Serneholt were eliminated from the contest.
 The second heat took place on 10 February 2007 at the Skellefteå Kraft Arena in Skellefteå. "Hope & Glory" performed by Måns Zelmerlöw and "1000 Miles" performed by H.E.A.T qualified directly to the final, while "It's My Life" performed by Amy Diamond and "Show Me Heaven" performed by Lili & Susie advanced to the Second Chance round. "It's My Life" was also selected by the international jury to progress to the wildcard round. "Jag ska slåss i dina kvarter!" performed by Lasse Lindh and Band, "Never Been Here Before" performed by Jennifer Brown, "Kärlekssång från mig" performed by Markoolio, and "What If" performed by Cookies 'N' Beans were eliminated from the contest.
 The third heat took place on 17 February 2007 at the Ejendals Arena in Leksand. "Baby Goodbye" performed by E.M.D. and "Så vill stjärnorna" performed by Molly Sandén qualified directly to the final, while "You're Not Alone" performed by BWO and "I Got U" performed by Rigo and the Topaz Sound feat. Red Fox advanced to the Second Chance round. "Alla" performed by Sofa was selected by the international jury to progress to the wildcard round. "The Queen" performed by Velvet, "Du vinner över mig" performed by Mikael Rickfors, and "Här för mig själv" performed by Maja Gullstrand were eliminated from the contest.
 The fourth heat took place on 24 February 2007 at the Malmö Arena in Malmö. "La voix" performed by Malena Ernman and "Love Love Love" performed by Agnes qualified directly to the final, while "Higher" performed by Star Pilots and "Moving On" performed by Sarah Dawn Finer advanced to the Second Chance round. "Moving On" was also selected by the international jury to progress to the wildcard round. "Du är älskad där du går" performed by Susanne Alfvengren, "Killing Me Tenderly" performed by Anna Sahlene and Maria Haukaas Storeng, "Sweet Kissin' in The Moonlight" performed by Thorleifs, and "Esta noche" performed by Next3 were eliminated from the contest.
 The Second Chance round (Andra chansen) took place on 3 March 2007 at the Himmelstalundshallen in Norrköping. "Moving On" performed by Sarah Dawn Finer and "Snälla, snälla" performed by Caroline af Ugglas qualified to the final. Of the two remaining songs eligible for the international jury wildcard, "Alla" performed by Sofa was selected to progress to the final.

Final
The final was held on 14 March at Globe Arena in Stockholm. 11 songs competed, with the winner being decided by a mix of televoting/SMS voting and jury voting. The final winner was Malena Ernman with the pop/opera song "La voix", composed by Ernman and last year's winning composer Fredrik Kempe, and was sung in both English and French. Ernman received top marks from the televoting public, and only came 8th with the juries. Second place went to Caroline af Ugglas with "Snälla, snälla", while third place went to boyband E.M.D. with "Baby Goodbye".

At Eurovision
Since Sweden is not one of the "Big Four" and was not the host of the 2009 contest, it had to compete in one of the two semi-finals.

Following a draw in Moscow, the Swedish entrant took part in the first semi-final on 12 May 2009, performing 5th. At the semifinal, Sweden's entry qualified for the final, which took take place on May 16. while the draw for the running order was held on 16 March 2009. It finished 21st of 25 participants with just 33 points.

Voting

Points awarded to Sweden

Points awarded by Sweden

Detailed voting results

References

External links 
 SVT's Melodifestivalen Website

2009
Countries in the Eurovision Song Contest 2009
Eurovision
Eurovision